Sierra is a 1950 American Western film directed by Alfred E. Green and starring Wanda Hendrix, Audie Murphy and Burl Ives.  The film was based on the 1937 novel The Mountains Are My Kingdom by Stuart Hardy.

Plot
Jeff Hassard (Dean Jagger) and his son Ring (Audie Murphy) lead an isolated existence in the mountains breaking horses, because Jeff is wanted for a murder he did not commit. Their lives are interrupted when they stumble upon a young woman, Riley (Wanda Hendrix). When Jeff is injured, Ring has to go into town to get help.

Cast
 Wanda Hendrix as Riley Martin
 Audie Murphy as Ring Hassard
 Burl Ives as Lonesome
 Dean Jagger as Jeff Hassard
 Richard Rober as Big Matt
 Tony Curtis as Brent Coulter (as Anthony Curtis)
 Houseley Stevenson as Sam Coulter
 Elliott Reid as Duke Lafferty
 Griff Barnett as Dr. Robbins
 Elisabeth Risdon as Aunt Susan
 Roy Roberts as Sheriff Knudson
 Gregg Martell as Hogan
 Sara Allgood as Mrs. Jonas
 Erskine Sanford as Judge Prentiss
 John Doucette as Jed Coulter
 James Arness as Little Sam (as Jim Arness)
 Ted Jordan as Jim Coulter
 I. Stanford Jolley as Snake Willens
 Jack Ingram as Al

Production
Wanda Hendrix was billed over Audie Murphy in the credits. They were married when the film was made, however their marriage was short and tumultuous, and the two were separated before the film was even released. According to various interviews and articles on the film, Murphy was suffering from what would eventually come to be known as post-traumatic stress disorder, which resulted in his often erratic and unpredictable behavior.

Parts of the film were shot in Kanab Canyon, Aspen Mirror Lake, Duck Creek, Cascade Falls, and Cedar Breaks in Utah.

References

External links

1950 films
1950 Western (genre) films
American Western (genre) films
Audie Murphy
Films based on Western (genre) novels
Films directed by Alfred E. Green
Films scored by Walter Scharf
Films shot in Utah
Films with screenplays by Edna Anhalt
Universal Pictures films
1950s English-language films
1950s American films